Lumír Sedláček (born 13 June 1978 in Chlebičov) is a former Czech football defender or midfielder. He has played for the Czech Republic national under-21 football team.

References

External links
 
 
 Profile at SFC Opava website 

1978 births
Living people
Czech footballers
Czech Republic under-21 international footballers
SK Slavia Prague players
FC Hradec Králové players
SFC Opava players
SK Dynamo České Budějovice players
Dyskobolia Grodzisk Wielkopolski players
Wisła Płock players
Piast Gliwice players
Polonia Warsaw players
Association football defenders
Sportspeople from České Budějovice
Expatriate footballers in Poland
Czech expatriate sportspeople in Poland